= Kot Puransingh =

- Village
- Country: India
- State: Punjab
- District: Kapurthala
- Tehsil: Phagwara

Government
  - Type: Panchayat raj
  - Body: Gram panchayat

Area
  - Total: 54.23 ha (134.0 acres)

Population (2011)
  - Total: 113; 64/49 ♂/♀
  - Scheduled Castes: 75; 42/33 ♂/♀
  - Total Households: 26

Languages
  - Official: Punjabi
- Time zone: UTC+5:30 (IST)
- ISO 3166 code: IN-PB
- Website: kapurthala.gov.in

Kot Puransingh is a village in Phagwara in Kapurthala district of Punjab State, India. It is located 1 kilometre (0.62 mi) from sub district headquarter and 46 kilometres (29 mi) from district headquarter. The village is administrated by Sarpanch an elected representative of the village.

== Demography ==
As of 2011, The village has a total number of 26 houses and the population of 113 of which 64 are males while 49 are females. According to the report published by Census India in 2011, out of the total population of the village 75 people are from Schedule Caste and the village does not have any Schedule Tribe population so far.

== See also ==
- List of villages in India
